Famous Last Words is a 1981 novel by Canadian author Timothy Findley, in which Hugh Selwyn Mauberley (originally from the Ezra Pound poem of the same name) is the main character.

In the book Findley poses a few ideas involving the flight of Rudolf Hess into Scotland.

References

 

1981 Canadian novels
Novels by Timothy Findley
Clarke, Irwin & Company books
Ezra Pound